Arthrobacter citreus is a bacterium species from the genus Arthrobacter. Arthrobacter citreus has the ability to degrade phenol.

References

Further reading

External links
Type strain of Arthrobacter citreus at BacDive -  the Bacterial Diversity Metadatabase

Bacteria described in 1954
Psychrophiles
Micrococcaceae